The Young Don't Cry is a 1957 American drama film directed by Alfred L. Werker and starring Sal Mineo, James Whitmore and J. Carrol Naish.

Plot
An all-boys orphanage is not far from a prison camp near a swamp. Leslie Henderson, a teen boy, gets to know one of the convicts, Rudy Krist, who saved Les's life from a rattlesnake.

Les stands up for a defenseless boy when bully Tom Bradley makes fun of a boat the boy made. Les is punished at the orphanage by a week of his summer vacation being taken away. Successful businessman Max Cole mocks boys like Les who look out for anybody but themselves. At the prison, Rudy and his inmate friend Doosy are treated inhumanely by a brutal warden, Plug.

Les decides to let Rudy know where the boat is, in case it can help him escape. When he sees Rudy flee in one direction, Doosy runs the other way, but is hunted down by prison dogs and killed. Rudy vows revenge but he, too, ends up dead. Cole feels sorry for Les and offers him a job, but Les has other plans for how to spend the rest of his life.

Cast
 Sal Mineo as Leslie Henderson  
 James Whitmore as Rudy Krist 
 J. Carrol Naish as Plug  
 Gene Lyons as Max Cole 
 Paul Carr as Tom Bradley  
 Thomas A. Carlin as Johnny Clancy  
 Leigh Whipper as Doosy  
 Stefan Gierasch as Billy  
 Victor Throley as Whittaker  
 Dolores Rosedale as Mrs. Maureen Cole  
 James Reese as Mr. Gwinn  
 Ruth Attaway as Philomena  
 Leland Mayforth as Allan  
 Richard Wigginton as Jimmy  
 Stanley Martin as Stanley Brown 
 Phillips Hamilton as Whigs  
 Victor Johnson as Hardhead  
 Joseph Killorin as Solomon  
 Josephine Smith as Mrs. Gwinn

See also
 List of American films of 1957

References

Bibliography
 Lawrence Frascella & Al Weisel. Live Fast, Die Young: The Wild Ride of Making Rebel Without a Cause. Simon and Schuster, 2005.

External links
 

1957 films
1957 drama films
American black-and-white films
American drama films
American prison films
Columbia Pictures films
1950s English-language films
Films about orphans
Films directed by Alfred L. Werker
Films scored by George Antheil
Films set in Georgia (U.S. state)
Films shot in Georgia (U.S. state)
Films shot in Savannah, Georgia
1950s American films